Tulia is a Polish folk music group. The band was formed in 2017, in Szczecin, Poland. There are three singers in the band: Dominika Siepka, Patrycja Nowicka and Tulia Biczak, whose name was chosen as the name of the band. They received major attention in Poland in 2017, after sharing a cover of Depeche Mode's song "Enjoy the Silence" on YouTube.

The group use the white voice singing technique.

Career 
In 2017 they recorded and uploaded their own version of Enjoy the Silence by Depeche Mode which in the same month was published on the band's fanpage. In November 2017, in Szczecin, Tulia band was officially formed.

In February 2018, they realised an official video to the song. It scored over 11 million views on YouTube. In the same month they presented a video clip to their cover of "Nieznajomy" by Dawid Podsiadło.

On 25 May 2018, they released their first album, called Tulia and distributed by Universal Music Poland, which includes a number of original songs, as well as covers of Polish and international artists. The album went platinum in Poland, selling more than 30,000 copies from the date of release.

On 9 June 2018, they performed their song "Jeszcze Cię nie ma" at 55. Krajowy Festiwal Piosenki Polskiej w Opolu. They received three statuettes: judges' prize, public's prize and a special prize from ZAiKS.

On 16 November 2018, Tulia (deluxe edition) was released in which their new original songs were added.

Eurovision Song Contest 2019 
On 15 February 2019, it was announced that Tulia had been chosen by Polish public TV broadcaster TVP to represent Poland in the Eurovision Song Contest 2019. The selected song was Fire of Love (Pali się). Before the contest they took part in several promoting parties.

On 14 May 2019, they performed in the first semi-final and placed 11th with 120 points, missing the final by 2 points.

Members 
Tulia Biczak (born 16 June 1991) is the oldest member of the band. She studied culture. The group was named after her because she introduced them to and got them to make a cover of Enjoy the Silence by Depeche Mode which started their popularity.

Dominika Siepka (born 13 June 1995) studied pre-school and early-school education. Apart from continuing singing, she would like to become a teacher.

Patrycja Nowicka (born 28 March 1998) finished her music school in the violin class. She is now concentrated on singing but sometimes she plays violin at live concerts.

Joanna Sinkiewicz (born 2 August 1998) is studying cosmetology and classical music. She left the group in August 2019 due to personal reasons and health issues.

Discography

Albums

Singles

Awards
 Fryderyk 2019 for New Face of Fonography

References 

Polish folk groups
Eurovision Song Contest entrants for Poland
Eurovision Song Contest entrants of 2019
Musical groups established in 2017
2017 establishments in Poland